Eduards Smiļģis (23 November 1886 – 19 April 1966) was a Latvian actor and theatre director. He became a People's Artist of the USSR in 1948.

Smiļģis founded the Dailes Theatre in Riga in 1920 and was its chief director until 1965. His home in Pārdaugava is now the Eduards Smiļģis Theater Museum.

References

Further reading 

1886 births
1966 deaths
Theatre people from Riga
Latvian male stage actors
Soviet male stage actors
Latvian theatre directors
Soviet theatre directors
People's Artists of the USSR
Recipients of the Order of Lenin
Lenin Prize winners
Stalin Prize winners
20th-century Latvian male actors